The third Nawaz Sharif ministry was formed at noon PKT on 5 June 2013 when Pakistan Muslim League (N) (PML-N) chief Nawaz Sharif became the prime minister of Pakistan for the third time. Sharif successfully led the right-of-centre and conservative PML-N to acquire a simple majority. in the 2013 general election against the leftist Pakistan Peoples Party (PPP) and the centrist Pakistan Tehreek-e-Insaf (PTI).

The cabinet was automatically dissolved on 28 July 2017 after Nawaz Sharif was disqualified and removed from the office of Prime Minister when the Supreme Court declared him guilty of not being truthful and honest.



Government formation
Following the 2013 general election, the Pakistan Muslim League (N) (PML-N) won a plurality of seats in the National Assembly through a simple majority, after failing to secure an overall two-thirds majority. In order to form a government, the PML-N joined in coalition with the Pakistan Muslim League (F) (PML-F) and the National Peoples Party (NPP).

Cabinet

Changes

 27 November 2013 – Khawaja Muhammad Asif and Pervez Rasheed are given additional charges of the Ministry of Defence and the Ministry of Law, Justice and Human Rights respectively.
 16 January 2014 – Khurram Dastgir Khan is elevated from the Ministry of State and sworn in as designate federal minister. Khan is later assigned as the federal minister for the Ministry of Commerce. With the induction of Jamiat Ulema-e-Islam (F) into the coalition government, JUI-F ministers Maulana Abdul Ghafoor Haideri and Akram Khan Durrani are made designate federal minister and designate minister of state respectively, while independent FATA legislator Abbas Afridi is also sworn in as designate federal minister.
23 October 2013 - Nasser Janjua replaced Sartaj Aziz as the National Security Advisor.

Major initiatives and actions

Foreign Policy Actions
Responding to the 2014 Jinnah International Airport attack
Launching the Operation Zarb-e-Azb and Operation Khyber-1
Enforcement and initiation of the National Action Plan against the terrorism
Initiated policies to provide commitment to work with President Ashraf Ghani on stabilizing Afghanistan 
Renewed commitment towards completing the Iran–Pakistan gas pipeline as part of the Energy security legislation. 
Establishing the National Intelligence Directorate
Initiated the China–Pakistan Economic Corridor 

Economic Policy Actions
Launched the privatization process in Pakistan
Launched the Pakistan Vision 2025 
Legislation to improve taxation system
Responding to the Late 2000s recession
Domestic Policy Actions
Education
Release funds for Higher Education Commission to focus on higher education research.
Social Policy
Prime Minister’s Youth Programme
Increasing the scope of the Benazir Income Support Programme
Other
Extended the Operation Madad in responding to 2014 Pakistan floods

National Security Actions
Reconstitute the National Security Council to maintain balance in civil military relations
Appointment of Sartaj Aziz as the National Security Advisor (NSA)
Continuation of the Nuclear power programme–2050 as part of the Energy security legislation.
Establishing military courts commission (Pakistan)|military courts commissions for terror suspects
Protection of Pakistan Ordinance No. 2014
Establishing the National Counter Terrorism Authority
Constitutional Actions
XXI Amendment to the Constitution of Pakistan

References

2013 establishments in Pakistan
Pakistan Muslim League (N)
Nawaz Sharif
Pakistani federal ministries